Ophiodes intermedius is a species of lizard of the Diploglossidae family. It is found in Argentina, Paraguay, Uruguay, and Bolivia.

References

Ophiodes
Reptiles described in 1894
Reptiles of Argentina
Reptiles of Paraguay
Reptiles of Uruguay
Reptiles of Bolivia
Taxa named by George Albert Boulenger